Schuylkill Arsenal Railroad Bridge is a wrought iron, two-track, deck truss swing bridge across the Schuylkill River between the University City and Grays Ferry neighborhoods of Philadelphia, Pennsylvania. It was built in 1885–86 by the Pennsylvania Railroad.
Today, its swing span has been fixed shut, and the electrical catenary de-energized.

The bridge is named for the Schuylkill Arsenal, which operated from 1799 to 1926 near the bridge's eastern approaches. Its western approach runs past the University of Pennsylvania's Meiklejohn Stadium.

In January 2014, a CSX train carrying crude oil derailed on the bridge.

Original bridge
The 1886 bridge replaced the original Arsenal Bridge, which was built by the Pennsylvania Railroad in 1861 and put in operation on January 27, 1862, as part of the Delaware Extension. It carried a single track over three wrought-iron spans on stone piers and a central center-pivot swing span.

See also

List of crossings of the Schuylkill River

References

Bridges completed in 1886
Bridges completed in 1862
Bridges in Philadelphia
Railroad bridges in Pennsylvania
Pennsylvania Railroad bridges
Bridges over the Schuylkill River
Swing bridges in the United States
Truss bridges in the United States
CSX Transportation bridges
1862 establishments in Pennsylvania
Wrought iron bridges in the United States